Elections to the Waterford Corporation took place on Thursday 15 January 1920 as part of that year's Irish local elections.

Results by party

Results by electoral area

Customs House and Center Ward

West Ward

South Ward

Tower Ward

New Center Ward

Citations 

1920 Irish local elections
1920